Business Time may refer to:
 "Business Time", an episode of Adventure Time (season 1)
 The Business Times (Singapore), a newspaper in Singapore
 Business Times (Malaysia), a newspaper in Malaysia, after splitting the ownership from Singapore
 Business Times (Tanzania)
 San Francisco Business Times, a newspaper in the United States
 "Business Time", a song by comedy musical group, Flight of the Conchords

See also
 BT (disambiguation)